The 11th Central Committee of the Chinese Communist Party was in a 5-year session from 1977 to 1982. The 10th Central Committee of the Chinese Communist Party preceded it.  It held seven plenary sessions in the 5-year period.  It was formally succeeded by the 12th Central Committee of the Chinese Communist Party.

It elected the 11th Politburo of the Chinese Communist Party in 1977.  It was the first Politburo elected after Mao Zedong's death in 1976.  This politburo was the first to discuss China's wide economic reforms, from the preceding period of high economic control.

Members
Hua Guofeng
The following is in stroke order of surnames:

In the 3rd Session in 1978, 9 persons were elected to the Central Committee: Huang Kecheng, Song Renqiong, Hu Qiaomu, Xi Zhongxun, Wang Renzhong, Huang Huoqing, Chen Zaidao, Han Guang, Zhou Huijiu.

In the 4th Session in 1979, 12 persons were elected to the Central Committee: Wang Heshou, Liu Lanbo, Liu Lantao, An Ziwen, Li Chang, Yang Shangkun, Zhou Yang, Lu Dingyi, Hong Xuezhi, Peng Zhen, Jiang Nanxiang, and Bo Yibo.

Chronology
1st Plenary Session
Date: August 18, 1977
Location: Beijing
Significance: Hua Guofeng was appointed Chairman of the CCP Central Committee, with Ye Jianying, Deng Xiaoping, Li Xiannian and Wang Dongxing as vice-chairmen. Hua was also appointed Chairman of the CCP Central Military Commission. 32-member Politburo (the largest ever), 5-member Politburo Standing Committee and other central organs were elected.
2nd Plenary Session
Date: February 18–23, 1978
Location: Beijing
Significance: The agenda was the preparation of the 5th National People's Congress and the 5th National Committee of the Chinese People's Political Consultative Conference. The 1978 Constitution of the People's Republic of China, reports to the NPC, nominees for top State posts and the new lyrics of the National Anthem praising Mao Zedong were approved.
3rd Plenary Session
Date: December 18–22, 1978
Location: Beijing
Significance: Official criticism of the Cultural Revolution started, and a new economic program aiming to liberalization was approved. Hua Guofeng renounced to his "Two Whatevers", and he was criticized for promoting personality cult. Chen Yun was appointed additional vice-chairman and Standing Committee member, and also head of the re-created Central Commission for Discipline Inspection. This session is considered the beginning of Deng Xiaoping's paramount leadership.
4th Plenary Session
Date: September 25–28, 1979
Location: Beijing
Significance: Preparations were made for the 30th anniversary of the People's Republic of China. A Decision of the Central Committee of the Chinese Communist Party On the Question of Speeding Up Agricultural Development was adopted. Peng Zhen, one of the top officials purged during the Cultural Revolution, was elected to the Politburo.
5th Plenary Session
Date: February 23–29, 1980
Location: Beijing
Significance: Liu Shaoqi was completely rehabilitated. The Secretariat of the CCP Central Committee was re-established with Hu Yaobang as General Secretary. Former Maoists including Wu De and Chen Xilian resigned. Article 45 of the State Constitution was amended by removing the citizens' right to "speak out freely, air their views fully, hold great debates and write dazibao". The decision to convene the 12th Party Congress was adopted.
6th Plenary Session
Date: June 27–29, 1981
Location: Beijing
Significance: The Resolution on Certain Questions in the History of Our Party Since the Founding of the People’s Republic of China was adopted, completely denouncing the Cultural Revolution and Mao Zedong's theory of continuing revolution under proletarian dictatorship. Hua Guofeng resigned (though he was re-elected a junior vice-chairman), replaced by Hu Yaobang as Chairman of the Central Committee and Deng Xiaoping as Chairman of the Central Military Commission.
7th Plenary Session
Date: August 6, 1982
Location: Beijing
Significance: Preparations were made for the 12th Party Congress.

Notes

External links
 11th Central Committee of the CCP, People's Daily Online.

Central Committee of the Chinese Communist Party
1977 establishments in China
1982 disestablishments in China